Rosnah Abdul Rashid Shirlin (born 10 July 1972) is a Malaysian politician who served as Special Advisor to the Minister of Health Khairy Jamaluddin from September 2021 to November 2022. She served as Deputy Minister of Works from May 2013 to May 2018 and Deputy Minister of Health from April 2009 to May 2013 in the Barisan Nasional (BN) administration under former Prime Minister Najib Razak, Minister Fadillah Yusof and former Minister Liow Tiong Lai as well as Member of Parliament (MP) for Papar from March 2004 to May 2018. She is member and Supreme Council member of the United Malays National Organisation (UMNO), a component party of the BN coalition. She also served as Women Youth Chief of UMNO from March 2009 to October 2013.

Personal life 
Rosnah was born on 10 July 1972 in Kota Belud, Sabah, Malaysia. Her father was an engineer while her mother was a housewife. Rosnah married Fadli Juanas on 11 July 2008. Rosnah and her family live in her hometown of Papar, Sabah.

Political career 
Rosnah was elected to Parliament in the 2004 election, after being nominated by Barisan Nasional to replace its incumbent member Osu Sukam. Her election was unopposed. Before her election, she was a lawyer, and the head of UMNO's Puteri (female youth) wing in Sabah.

In March 2009 she became the head of UMNO's women's youth wing ("UMNO Puteri") and was subsequently appointed Deputy Minister for Health by incoming Prime Minister Najib Razak.

On 16 May 2013, after the 13th General Election, she was shifted from Deputy Health Minister to Deputy Works Minister. Also in 2013, she relinquished the leadership of UMNO Puteri due to her exceeding the organisation's age limit, and was elected to the Supreme Council of the full party.

Election results

Honour
  :
  Commander of the Order of Kinabalu (PGDK) - Datuk (2007)

References 

20th-century Malaysian lawyers
Living people
Members of the Dewan Rakyat
Women members of the Dewan Rakyat
Women in Sabah politics
United Malays National Organisation politicians
1972 births
Malaysian Muslims
People from Sabah
International Islamic University Malaysia alumni
Malaysian women lawyers
People from Kota Belud District
Commanders of the Order of Kinabalu